The Fly is a fictional character who first appeared in the DC Comics' Impact Comics series, The Fly. The character is loosely based on Archie Comics' character, The Fly.

Fictional character biography
Jason Troy was given an extra assignment by his mythology teacher, Mr. Abin (likely a nod to Abin Sur, the alien that bequeathed Green Lantern Hal Jordan his power ring) for playing video games in class, to make a hero based on the most humble of creatures. Jason designed a superhero patterned after a fly, and his teacher rewarded him for his efforts with a pendant made of a fly trapped in amber. Jason soon learned that the pendant was not just jewelry, it turned him into the superhero from his assignment. He became the Fly, and used his powers to foil an arson attempt by a super-villain named "Burnout". After he defeated the flame-throwing thug, he suddenly changed back into Jason. Obviously confused, he went to find his mythology teacher and question him about the pendant. When he returned to school to ask his teacher about the pendant, nobody in the school remembered ever seeing his teacher.

Jason learned that the pendant could change him into his heroic alter-ego at will, so he continued his exploits as the Fly. He learned that using the Fly powers for a prolonged period of time physically exhausted him, and that he had cravings for anything high in sugar, like jelly doughnuts and pineapple juice. But he soon mastered his insect-like abilities (and urges). He also seemed to often lose track of time as the Fly, a fact that landed him in trouble at home several times.

He fought flying thieves, mechanical spiders, and the occasional crime lord, and defeated them all. But he found himself in a sticky situation when his pendant was ripped off in a battle, but he did not lose his powers. He couldn't return home, since even when he took off his costume, he still looked like a muscular adult with fly-like eyes. He got a job as a bouncer in a bar (calling himself "Buzz") for a few days until he found his pendant. He joined the Crusaders, and when they got lost in another dimension, he spent years there with his teammates and fell in love with the Jaguar. When they finally returned, the Fly married the Jaguar.

Powers and abilities
The Fly has superhuman strength and insect-like wings that allow him to fly. The wings have also been shown to have a vibrational effect should he be restrained. He can stick to (and climb) any surface, such as walls, ceilings, etc.

The Fly's costume acts as an exo-skeletal body armor, though it is not completely invulnerable. It is knife-proof, and offers some protection against bullets, and even small amounts of radiation. The large goggles in the mask allow him 270-degree vision, meaning he can see anything that happens except what is directly behind him. In his superhero form, he can remove the suit and mask, but his eyes appear to be compound eyes, similar to those of an insect (as seen in The Fly Annual #1).

The amulet that is the source of his powers allow him to transform from a skinny teen to a muscular adult. Jason does this by touching the amulet and picturing himself as The Fly. The amulet is required in order for him to change back into Jason Troy. Whether or not the amulet would work for other people is unknown, but it does not seem likely as the message left for him by his mysterious benefactor, Mr. Abin, said they had been searching for someone like him for some time.

DC Comics superheroes
DC Comics characters with superhuman strength